The following lists events that happened during 1918 in Chile.

Incumbents
President of Chile: Juan Luis Sanfuentes

Events

March
10 March – Chilean parliamentary election, 1918

Births
31 May – Ricardo Echeverría (d. 1970)
24 April – Jorge Prat (d. 1971)
11 September – César Mendoza (d. 1996)
15 September – Margot Loyola (d. 2015)
26 September – Fernando Alegría (d. 2005)
11 November – Enrique Silva Cimma (d. 2012)
26 November – Patricio Aylwin (d. 2016)

Deaths 
16 February – Rafael Sotomayor Gaete (b. 1848)

Works of fiction taking place in 1918 Chile 
Chilean soap opera Los Pincheira is located in Yerbas Buenas, Chile, in 1918.

References 

 
Years of the 20th century in Chile
Chile